Cirsosiopsis is a monotypic, genus of fungi in the Microthyriaceae family. It only has one known species, Cirsosiopsis violacescens .

References

External links
Index Fungorum

Microthyriales